Nikolai Ivanovich Titenok (5 December 1962 – 16 May 1986) was a Soviet firefighter and first responder to the Chernobyl disaster. He received a lethal dose of radiation whilst firefighting and was hospitalised in Moscow Hospital No.6, and died 20 days later from radiation poisoning.

Life 
Titenok was born in the village of Vilcha in northern Ukraine. After graduating high school in 1980, he immediately entered the Kronstadt Naval School No. 42 reached the rank of starshina 1st class (equivalent to a sergeant) and graduated in June 1981. He served in the Soviet Navy until October 1984, and joined the Soviet Ministry of Internal Affairs as a firefighter on December 20th 1984.

He was married to Tatyana Titenok in early 1985, and their son Sergey was born in September 1985.

Chernobyl disaster 
NIkolai Titenok was attached to SPVCH-6, (Militarised Fire Department 6) located around 4km (2.5 mi) from the power plant. And was on duty at the time of the disaster. From his surviving colleagues' testimonies, Titenok climbed aboard a Zil-130 ATS Pump truck and departed from the station towards the plant, in the same car as Ignatenko.
When he arrived the truck was parked on the north side of the plant, between units 3&4, but was later relocated to the turbine hall. He was called over to Lieutenant Kibenok, who was assembling a squad to climb to the roof. This squad consisted of Vasily Ignatenko, Nikolai TItenok, Nikolai Vashchuk, Vladimir Tishura and Viktor Kibenok, but since they were city firefighters, they didn't know their way up to the roof. Volodymyr Pravyk shift leader of ВПЧ-2, the power plant's fire station, volunteered himself to guide them. Titenok was part of a hose team along with Nikolai Vashchuk, with Titenok operating the nozzle.

The squad of 6 were moving around the roof of reactor 3 and the base of the ventilation stack, hosing down various small fires which were caused by fragments of superheated graphite from inside the core igniting the bitumen-covered roof. In Telyatnikov's official report, it was stated there were around 5 small blazes on the roof that night.

At approximately 2:20 AM, Titenok fell unconscious due to the early onset of severe ARS, and was carried down to the turbine hall along with the rest of his squad by the members of Pravyk's unit, who were firefighting on the roof of the turbine hall. And at around 2:40 AM, they were taken to Pripyat Hospital by ambulance.

Hospitalization and death 
On the night of the accident, Titenok was admitted to Sanitary Unit No.126 in Pripyat and stayed there for a day, before being transported by plane from Boryspil Airport to Moscow. They then were admitted to Hospital No.6 in Moscow, which specialised in treating radiological accidents.

On May 4th, Titenok wrote to his wife and son from hospital, the letter read as follows:

"Hello, my beloved wife and my son Serezhenka! Today is Sunday, May 4th. It's been a week since I got here. The main thing... How is my health? Fine. Only it is very, very painful to swallow and eat, there are many blisters in my mouth. But soon everything will pass, in two weeks. They'll put a catheter in the chest, that is, a tube that food comes through. The veins in my arms were swollen from the IV's. They are replaced every day. I'm lying down and writing slowly. Walking around is not allowed.

And now about the most important thing. How are my son and you feeling? Are you healthy? Describe everything, all of the features. I dream about you, you are in front of my eyes and I think about you all the time. Tanya, come back in two weeks, May 19th-20th, I'll be waiting. I'm lying down, they won't let me out of the ward to go anywhere. And on May 20th, I will feel better, I will be able to stay with you longer and take a walk. Do not worry. I'm already tired, and a little headache. I kiss you and Serezha tightly. I hug everyone tightly.

Nikolai, your husband.

May 4, 1986"

On May 7th, his condition began to worsen. His wife visited the ward everyday until his death. When Tatyana entered his room on May 8th, Nikolai requested for her to bring him some sea buckthorn oil from Pripyat - he was unaware it had been evacuated. He then reportedly asked his wife to take him home to Ukraine, and for her to come take him out of the ward on May 16th. And on May 16th, he died.

Nikolai Titenok's official cause of death was a blistered heart due to severe ARS, and he was buried in Mitinskoe Cemetery, Moscow, along with the other deceased firefighters and plant workers.

Awards 
Order of the Red Banner (1986)

Ukraine's Order for Courage (1996)

Hero of Ukraine (2006)

Legacy 
Titenok's wife and son are both still alive as of 2019. His son Sergey became a firefighter in Kyiv. Multiple monuments and statues have been erected in his honour all across Ukraine, including a bust in the "Heroes of Chernobyl Alley".

References 

1986 deaths
People associated with the Chernobyl disaster
1962 births
Soviet firefighters
Victims of radiological poisoning